The appearance of nudity in music videos has caused controversy since the late 1970s, and several explicit music videos have been censored or banned. Nudity has gained wider acceptance on European television, where audiences often view nudity and sexuality as less objectionable than the depiction of violence. In contrast, MTV, VH1 and other North American music-related television channels usually censor what they think is inappropriate and might be considered offensive to their viewers.

Notable examples

1970s

1980s

1981

1982

1983

1984

1985

1986

1987

1988

1989

1990s

1990

1991

1992

1993

1994

1996

1997

1998

1999

2000s

2000

2001

2002

2003

2004

2005

2006

2007

2008

2009

2010s

2010

2011

2012

2013

2014

2015

2016

2017

2019

2020s

2020

2021

2023

See also 
Censorship of music
Nudity in film
Sexuality in music videos

Notes

References
"BET provides more 'exposure' for music videos", MSNBC, 15 April 2004
"Music videos bare more than souls", Boston Globe, 24 December 2009
"Too much raunch, too little music", Herald Sun, 17 July 2007
"NOTICED; Singing in the Buff: The Pure Beefcake Video", New York Times, 6 February 2000
:sv:Kayo, Mentioning in the Swedish version of the article that the video caused some controversy back in 1993.

Lists of music videos
Nudity in television